Ilen Rovers is a Gaelic football club in County Cork, Ireland. The club is affiliated to Cork GAA and Carbery GAA divisional boards.
Ilen Rovers is located in a rural community that is located on the River Ilen, the river that flows through Skibbereen before entering the sea near the fishing port of Baltimore, the gateway to the islands of Sherkin, Cape Clear and Heir. The club crest depicts this rural geographical area showing the Beacon to the south and Kilcoe castle to the west with the Ilen flowing between and the sea beyond.

History
The club was founded in 1973. It comprises players from the parish of Rath and the Islands and the parish of Aughadown, the two parishes that bound the river estuary.
In the club's first year, three teams were affiliated under 14, under16 & minor. In the club's first year they the SW minor B championship.  The following season, the club entered additional teams, in the under 21 and junior B category,  with the under 21s losing the SW championship final.  They were runners up in the same competition in 1975, before winning this championship at the third attempt in 1976. The junior team achieved less, losing in the first round of the junior B championship from 1974-1982. The junior team won the championship in 1983, before losing for the next 4 consecutive years, and were regraded in 1988.  The Junior B championship was won again that year, and the team reached its first county final, but lost to Abbey Rovers. 

The early 1990s saw a lack of victories for the club, until 1995, when the minor team won league and championship double, and followed this with Cork Minor B Football Championship honours, beating Newtownshandrum in both league and championship finals. In the following year, 1996, the club won its first West Cork Junior A Football championship in its first final appearance.

A second junior A title was won in 1999 and three SW junior A titles were won in a row, 1999, 2000 & 2001.  It was a setback to lose the Cork Junior Football Championship final in 1999 by a point to Youghal, but 2001 yielded dividends capturing the title by overcoming Kinsale. The first year up in the intermediate grade, 2002, was a successful one, winning the county league title and also the All Ireland junior 7 a-side. They returned the following year to win the Cork Intermediate Football Championship, beating Carrigaline in the final.  This was followed up by winning the inaugural Munster Intermediate Club Football Championship in this grade, beating St Senan's of Limerick in the provincial decider and the first All-Ireland Intermediate Club Football Championship title by defeating St Michael's of Donegal.

The Under 16's went on to win the club's first ever SW championship at this grade in 2005, and followed it up with victories in 2006 & 2007, to complete the club's second three in a row. The under 16’s reached the county final in 2005, losing out to Valley Rovers and again in 2006, losing to Glenville in the final. The club has also introduced Hurling at underage level in recent years.

Meanwhile, the club made its senior championship debut in 2004 and the appearance in a county final at the grade so soon would seem an improbable dream to the founders of the club.

Since 2004 the club has been building a strong underage system in which they've won three Under 16 West Cork titles (2005,2006,2007) with 2 appearances in County Finals (2005 & 2007) losing both by narrow margins. They have also won 3 West Cork Minor B Titles 2007, 2009, 2010 and 1 Minor County B Title in 2010 defeating Naomh Aban, This was the club's 2nd ever County Title at underage level to date. Whilst in 2011 they won their first ever Western Region Minor A title, while losing narrowly lost the County Final to Kanturk in the club's first ever County A appearance.

In those early years of the club, they had no proper pitch of their own and depended on local farmers to provide fields. In the late 1970s the club, in tandem with Aughadown Community Council, started to develop a playing pitch in Church Cross which was completed in 1982.  More recently, a second pitch has been completed in Rath and was opened in 2005.  This is hugely important for the club as the number of participating teams has risen from eight in 2004 to thirteen in 2007.

Honours
 Cork Senior Football Championship Runners-Up 2007
 Cork Intermediate Football Championship Winners (1) 2003
 Cork Junior Football Championship Winners (1) 2001  Runners-Up 1999
 Munster Intermediate Club Football Championship Winners (1) 2003
 All-Ireland Intermediate Club Football Championship Winners (1) 2004
 Cork Minor A Football Championship Winners (1) 2014 Runners-up 2011
 Cork Minor B Football Championship Winners (2) 1995, 2010
 West Cork Junior A Football Championship Winners (4) 1996, 1999, 2000, 2001  Runners-Up 1997
 West Cork Junior B Football Championship Winners (2) 1983, 1988
 West Cork Junior D Football Championship Winners (4) 1983, 1988, 1996, 2015  Runners-up 2013
 West Cork Under-21 A Football Championship Winners (3) 2009, 2016, 2018 Runners-Up 1991, 2004
 West Cork Under-21 B Football Championship Winners (2) 1976, 1996  Runners-Up 1974, 1975, 1981
 West Cork Minor A Football Championship Winners (2) 2011, 2014 Runners-Up 1998, 2001
 West Cork Minor B Football Championship Winners (7) 1973, 1989, 1995, 1997, 2007, 2009, 2010  Runners-Up 1981, 1986, 1988, 2003

Notable players
 Fachtna Collins
 Kevin O'Sullivan

References

External sources
Ilen Rovers GAA Website

Gaelic football clubs in County Cork
Gaelic games clubs in County Cork